Laura Victoria Olascuaga Pinto (born 19 June 1995 in Cartagena, Colombia) is a Colombian model and beauty pageant titleholder who was crowned Miss Universe Colombia 2020 pageant on November 16, 2020. She represented Colombia at Miss Universe 2020 placing in Top 21.

Early life and education
Olascuaga was born in Cartagena, raised in the capital of the Department of Bolívar. She graduated from the Universidad del Norte in Barranquilla city, where she earned her bachelor degree in social communication and journalism.

Pageantry

Señorita Colombia 2018
Olascuaga began her pageantry career representing the Department of Bolívar in Señorita Colombia 2018 on November 12, 2018. She placed first runner-up, being awarded the title of “Virreina”, but resigned the following day.

Miss Universe Colombia 2020
On November 16, 2020, Olascuaga, representing the Department of Bolívar, won the title of Miss Universe Colombia 2020, although she notably tripped during the Evening Gown competition. Olascuaga was crowned by former Miss Germany and current director of Miss Universe Colombia, Natalie Ackermann and Miss Universe 2018, Catriona Gray of the Philippines.

Miss Universe 2020 
As the winner of Miss Universe Colombia, Olascuaga represented Colombia at the 69th edition of the Miss Universe pageant, where she placed in Top 21.

References

External links

1995 births
Living people
Colombian beauty pageant winners
Colombian female models
Colombian people of Lebanese descent
Colombian women lawyers
Miss Colombia winners
Miss Universe 2020 contestants